The men's discus throw at the 1966 European Athletics Championships was held in Budapest, Hungary, at Népstadion on 30 and 31 August 1966.

Medalists

Results

Final
31 August

Qualification
30 August

Participation
According to an unofficial count, 24 athletes from 14 countries participated in the event.

 (1)
 (2)
 (1)
 (2)
 (3)
 (1)
 (1)
 (2)
 (2)
 (2)
 (2)
 (2)
 (1)
 (2)

References

Discus throw
Discus throw at the European Athletics Championships